Arsenio Pastor Erico Martínez (30 March 1915 – 23 July 1977) was a Paraguayan football striker. He is the all-time highest goalscorer in the Argentine first division, with 295 goals according to Argentine Football Association. Previously it had been affirmed that Erico's record was 293 goals, sharing the record with Angel Labruna All the goals in Erico's career in Primera División were scored playing for Independiente. Erico is also considered the best Paraguayan footballer of all time and for some is the best player in history, including Alfredo Di Stefano. A striker noted for his technique, finishing and aerial ability, Erico was regarded one of the finest players of the 1930s and one of greatest players to have played in the Argentinean league.

Career

As a player

Erico, born in Asunción, Paraguay, began his career in Club Nacional of Paraguay and made his debut in the club's first-team squad at the age of 15.
During the early 1930s, Erico was part of the Paraguayan Red Cross football team that was on tour in Argentina in order to gather funds for the Chaco War. Because of his good performances during the friendly matches in the mentioned tour, Club Atlético Independiente of Argentina signed him. He made his debut for Independiente on 5 May 1936 and began to demonstrate why he had acquired the nickname 'red jumper'. Before the 1938 FIFA World Cup Erico was offered an extravagant amount of money to play for the Argentina national football team but he rejected it, gaining the praise in the general Argentine public for remaining loyal to his country of origin. Soon after this, however, Erico caught an infection which led to a long period out on the sidelines. Then, in 1937, he broke his leg. After he recovered, however, he reminded everyone of his talent by taking Independiente to the league title in 1938 and 1939. Later, he joined Huracán where he only played 7 games in 1947 before retiring.

After retirement

After retiring from football, Erico decided to live in Argentina, although he often visited his country of origin. He had a brief career as a coach, managing the club where he started his career as a footballer, Nacional and also had a brief stint in Club Sol de América where he led the team to a second-place finish in the 1957 Paraguayan Primera División. In 1960, he got married with Aurelia Blanco. They had no children.

In 1970 Erico was honored in Asunción, Paraguay during a friendly match between Argentina and Paraguay national sides in the Estadio Defensores del Chaco that was at its full capacity.

In 1977 his left leg had to be cut off, and he finally died of a heart attack on 23 July 1977. While the match between River and Independiente (played the day following his death at Tomas Adolfo Duco Palace) was being played, the crowd acclaimed Erico singing "Se siente, se siente, Erico está presente (We feel it, we feel it, Erico is with us)".

Erico was buried in the Cemetery of Morón in Greater Buenos Aires. Independiente paid the costs of burial expenses and funeral.

Legacy
Erico was an inspiration to Argentine player Alfredo Di Stéfano, who considered him one of the greatest players ever. Other figures like Brazilian striker Leônidas da Silva and Paraguayan Delfín Benítez Cáceres also consider Erico as one of the best players in history. Argentine striker Francisco Varallo remembers Erico as a "phenomenon" that would excel in scoring headers due to his high jumps.

Club Nacional stadium is named after him, and sections of the Defensores del Chaco stadium in Paraguay and the Libertadores de América stadium in Avellaneda also carry Arsenio Erico's name. He died on 23 July 1977.

Career statistics

Titles

Club
Independiente
 Primera División (2): 1938, 1939
 Copa Dr. Ibarguren (2): 1938, 1939
 Copa Adrián Escobar (1): 1939
 Copa Aldao (2): 1938, 1939

Nacional
 Paraguayan Primera División (1): 1942

References

1915 births
1977 deaths
Paraguayan footballers
Club Nacional footballers
Club Atlético Independiente footballers
Club Atlético Huracán footballers
Argentine Primera División players
Expatriate footballers in Argentina
Paraguayan expatriate footballers
Paraguayan football managers
Association football forwards
Sportspeople from Asunción
20th-century Paraguayan people